The 2020 season was UiTM FC's first competitive season in the highest tier of Malaysian football after got promoted from 2019 Malaysia Premier League.

Competitions

Malaysia Super League

League table

Malaysia FA Cup

Statistics

Appearances and goals

|-
! colspan="16" style="background:#dcdcdc; text-align:center"| Goalkeepers

|-
! colspan="16" style="background:#dcdcdc; text-align:center"| Defenders

|-
! colspan="16" style="background:#dcdcdc; text-align:center"| Midfielders

|-
! colspan="16" style="background:#dcdcdc; text-align:center"| Forwards

|-
!colspan="14"|Players who left UiTM during the season:
|}

References

UiTM
UiTM FC